The Norwood Avenue station is a skip-stop station on the BMT Jamaica Line of the New York City Subway. Located at the intersection of Norwood Avenue and Fulton Street in Cypress Hills, Brooklyn, it is served by the Z train during rush hours in peak direction and the J at all other times.

History 

This station was opened on May 30, 1893 as part of the Brooklyn Elevated Railroad's four stop extension of the Lexington Avenue Line to Cypress Hills.

From July 18, 2005 to March 13, 2006 this station was closed for rehabilitation. As part of the rehabilitation project, the stairs were rehabilitated, the floors were renewed, major structural repairs were made, new canopies were installed, the area around the station booth was reconfigured, the platform edge strips were replaced, walls were replaced, and a high-quality public address system was installed. The renovation cost $8.40 million.

In 2019, the Metropolitan Transportation Authority announced that this station would become ADA-accessible as part of the agency's 2020–2024 Capital Program.

Station layout

This elevated station has two tracks and one island platform. The platform has a short red canopy with green frames and support columns at the east (railroad north) end and silver lampposts and black station sign structures for the rest of the length.

The 2007 artwork here is called "Culture Swirl" by Margaret Lazetta, It consists of stained glass artwork of various images on the platform sign structures, as of March 2022, The artwork has been covered up with green pained wood for reasons unknown.

Joint service with the Long Island Rail Road's Atlantic Branch existed between Norwood Avenue  and Crescent Street stations with a connection built at Chestnut Street in Brooklyn. This allowed BRT trains to access the Rockaways and Manhattan Beach while affording the LIRR a connection into Manhattan to the BRT terminal located at Park Row over the Brooklyn Bridge (this service predated the opening of the East River Tunnels to Penn Station). This service ended in 1917 when the United States Railroad Administration took over the LIRR, and classified different operating standards between rapid transit trains and regular heavy rail railroads such as the LIRR.

Exit
The station's only entrance/exit is a station house connected to the platform at the extreme east end. It has a bank of three turnstiles, token booth, and one staircase going down to an elevated passageway beneath the tracks, where two staircases go down to either eastern corners of Norwood Avenue and Fulton Street.

References

External links 

 
 Station Reporter — J Train
 The Subway Nut — Norwood Avenue Pictures
 MTA's Arts For Transit — Norwood Avenue (BMT Jamaica Line)
 Norwood Avenue entrance from Google Maps Street View
Platform from Google Maps Street View

BMT Jamaica Line stations
1893 establishments in New York (state)
Cypress Hills, Brooklyn
New York City Subway stations in Brooklyn
Railway stations in the United States opened in 1893